The Interim Government of India, also known as the Provisional Government of India, formed on 2  September 1946 from the newly elected Constituent Assembly of India, had the task of assisting the transition of British India to independence. It remained in place until 15 August 1947, the date of the independence (and partition) of India, and the creation of Pakistan.

Formation
After the end of the Second World War, the British authorities in India released all political prisoners who had participated in the Quit India movement. The Indian National Congress, which had long fought for self rule, agreed to participate in elections for a constituent assembly, as did the Muslim League. The newly elected government of Clement Attlee dispatched the 1946 Cabinet Mission to India  to formulate proposals for the formation of a government that would lead to an independent India.

The elections for the Constituent Assembly were not direct elections, as the members were elected from each of the provincial legislative assemblies. In the event, the Indian National Congress won a majority of the seats, some 69 per cent, including almost every seat in areas with a majority Hindu electorate. The Congress had clear majorities in eight of the eleven provinces of British India. The Muslim League won the seats allocated to the Muslim electorate.

Viceroy's Executive Council
The Viceroy's Executive Council became the executive branch of the interim government. Originally headed by the Viceroy of India, it was transformed into a council of ministers, with the powers of a prime minister bestowed on the vice-president of the Council, a position held by the Congress leader Jawaharlal Nehru. After independence, all members would be Indians, apart from the Viceroy, in August to become the Governor-General, Lord Mountbatten, who would hold only a ceremonial position, and the Commander-in-Chief, India, Sir Claude Auchinleck, replaced after independence by General Sir Rob Lockhart.

The senior Congress leader Vallabhbhai Patel held the second-most powerful position in the Council, heading the Department of Home Affairs, Department of Information and Broadcasting. The Sikh leader Baldev Singh was responsible for the Department of Defence and Chakravarthi Rajagopalachari was named to head the Department of Education and arts. Asaf Ali, a Muslim Congress leader, headed the Department of Railways and Transport. Scheduled Caste leader Jagjivan Ram headed the Department of Labour, while Rajendra Prasad headed the Department of Food and Agriculture and John Mathai headed the Department of Industries and Supplies.

Upon the Muslim League joining the interim government, the second highest-ranking League politician, Liaquat Ali Khan, became the head of the Department of Finance. Abdur Rab Nishtar headed the Departments of Posts and Air and Ibrahim Ismail Chundrigar headed the Department of Commerce. The League nominated a Scheduled Caste Hindu politician, Jogendra Nath Mandal, to lead the Department of Law.

Cabinet of the Interim Government of India

First Interim Cabinet

Reconstituted Cabinet

Activities
Although until August 1947 British India remained under the sovereignty of the United Kingdom,  the interim government proceeded to establish diplomatic relations with other countries, including the United States. Meanwhile, the Constituent Assembly, from which the Interim Government was drawn, began the task of drafting a constitution for independent India.

See also
 Viceroy's Executive Council
 Council of State (India)
 Imperial Legislative Council
 Central Legislative Assembly

References

Government of British India
History of the government of India
Indian independence movement
1940s in India
1946 in India
1947 in India
Constituent Assembly of India
Provisional governments
1946 in British India
1947 in British India